

Best Screenplay (1997, 2000)

1997
Boogie Nights – Paul Thomas AndersonGood Will Hunting – Ben Affleck, Matt Damon
L.A. Confidential – Curtis Hanson, Brian Helgeland

2000Almost Famous – Cameron CroweQuills – Doug Wright
State and Main – David Mamet
Traffic – Stephen Gaghan
Wonder Boys – Steve Kloves
You Can Count on Me – Kenneth Lonergan

Best Cast / Ensemble (1998-2002)
1998Saving Private Ryan
Happiness
Your Friends & Neighbors

1999
American Beauty
Being John Malkovich
The Cradle Will Rock
The Green Mile
Magnolia

2000
Almost Famous /
State and Main

Requiem for a Dream
Traffic
Wonder Boys

2001
Gosford Park
Ghost World
The Lord of the Rings: The Fellowship of the Ring
Ocean's Eleven
The Royal Tenenbaums

2002
The Lord of the Rings: The Two Towers
8 Women
Adaptation.
Chicago
Gangs of New York

Best Film Review Website (1999)
Roger Ebert (suntimes.com/ebert/index.html)

Best DVD (2000-2001)
2000: Fight Club 
2001: Moulin Rouge

Best DVD Special Features (2000)
2000: Fight Club

Best DVD Commentary (2000)
2000: Fight Club

Best Film Related Website (2000)
2000: Internet Movie Database

Best Art Direction  (2002-2003)
2002: Far From Heaven 

designed by Mark Friedberg (production design) Ellen Christiansen (set decoration)
2003: The Lord of the Rings: The Return of the King 
designed by Grant Major (production design) Dan Hennah and Alan Lee (set decoration)

Best Costume Design (2002-2003)
2002: Far From Heaven 

designed by Sandy Powell
2003: The Lord of the Rings: The Return of the King 

designed by Ngila Dickson and Richard Taylor

Best Sound (2002-2003)
2002: The Lord of the Rings: The Two Towers 

designed by Christopher Boyes, Michael Semanick, Michael Hedges and Hammond Peek
2003: The Lord of the Rings: The Return of the King 

designed by Christopher Boyes, Michael Semanick, Michael Hedges and Hammond Peek
2013: Gravity (given as special award)

Best Visual Effects (2002-2003)
2002: The Lord of the Rings: The Two Towers 

designed by Jim Rygiel, Joe Letteri, Randall William Cook and Alex Funke
2003: The Lord of the Rings: The Return of the King 

designed by Jim Rygiel, Joe Letteri, Randall William Cook and Alex Funke
2013: Gravity (given as special award)

References

Online Film Critics Society Awards
Lists of films by award
Former awards